Bodh Raj Sawhney was a judge of the first High Court of Jammu and Kashmir upon its establishment in March 1928. He was appointed as a puisne judge, along with Khan Bahadur Aga Syed Hussain.

References

Indian legal scholars
20th-century Indian judges
Jammu and Kashmir politicians